George Raymond Stevenson (born 25 May 1964) is a Northern Irish actor. He is known for playing Dagonet in the film King Arthur (2004) and Titus Pullo in the BBC/HBO television series Rome (2005–2007). He has portrayed two Marvel Comics characters: Frank Castle / The Punisher in Punisher: War Zone (2008) and The Super Hero Squad Show, and Volstagg in the Marvel Cinematic Universe (2011–2017). His other films include Kill the Irishman (2011), where he portrayed mobster Danny Greene, The Three Musketeers, and RRR (2022), where he portrayed the villainous Governor Scott. His television roles include Ukrainian mobster Isaak Sirko in the seventh season of Dexter, Blackbeard in the third and fourth seasons of Black Sails, and voicing Gar Saxon in Star Wars Rebels and Star Wars: The Clone Wars.

Early life
George Raymond Stevenson was born in Lisburn on 25 May 1964, the second of three sons born to Irish parents. His father was a Royal Air Force pilot. He moved to England with his family at the age of eight, first settling in the Lemington area of Newcastle upon Tyne and later in Seaton Delaval. He attended the Bristol Old Vic Theatre School, graduating at the age of 29.

Career

Film
Stevenson made his film debut in The Theory of Flight (1998) as a gigolo hired to help Helena Bonham Carter's character lose her virginity. In 2002, he starred in the short film No Man's Land, which was the antipodal picture from actor/director Edward Hicks prior to his graduation from the London Film School. In the 12 minute film, set during World War I, Stevenson portrayed an experienced private who is forced to help a novice officer (David Birkin) back to safety after they both find themselves trapped and isolated in "No Man's Land" during the Battle of Ypres. In 2004, he starred in King Arthur as Dagonet, a knight of the round table who sacrifices his life for his comrades. His first leading role in a film was in the Scottish horror picture Outpost (2008), portraying a mercenary pitted against Nazi zombies in a bunker somewhere in Eastern Europe. That same year, he also starred in Punisher: War Zone, as Frank Castle / The Punisher, a former Marine turned vigilante after the murder of his family. In 2010, he played an antagonist in the comedy The Other Guys.

In 2011, Stevenson appeared in the film Kill the Irishman, based on the book To Kill the Irishman: The War That Crippled the Mafia, as Danny Greene, the Irish mob boss who took on the Italian-American Cleveland crime family during the 1970s. He starred as Volstagg, one of Thor's trusted comrades, in the 2011 Marvel film Thor. Also that year, he played Porthos in Paul W. S. Anderson's adaptation of The Three Musketeers. He played Firefly in G.I. Joe: Retaliation, released in 2013. He appeared in the Finnish-American thriller film Big Game. In 2014, he starred in the film Divergent, based on the first book of The Divergent Series. He reprised his role in the sequels, The Divergent Series: Insurgent, released in March 2015, and The Divergent Series: Allegiant, released in March 2016.

In 2019, he was announced as a lead antagonist in the movie RRR, a Telugu film directed by S.S.Rajamouli and released in 2022. This marks his debut in Indian cinema.

Television
Stevenson is known for playing legionary Titus Pullo in the BBC/HBO series Rome. Other television work includes guest appearances in popular series including Waking the Dead and Murphy's Law as well as lead roles in City Central and At Home with the Braithwaites. He has also appeared in several TV films such as Some Kind of Life in 1995, and The Return of the Native. Some of his earliest parts were in two Catherine Cookson films: The Dwelling Place (1994) and The Tide of Life (1996). Stevenson reprised his role this time as the voice of the Punisher in The Super Hero Squad Show and played the role of Isaak Sirko in the seventh season of Dexter in 2012.

On 24 March 2015, it was announced by producers that Stevenson would be joining the cast of the STARZ series Black Sails as the character Edward Teach.

Stage
Stevenson's stage work includes playing the part of Jesus Christ in the York Mystery Plays in 2000 at York Minster. In 2001, he took the part of Roger in the play Mouth to Mouth by Kevin Elyot, at the Albery Theatre in London with Lindsay Duncan and Michael Maloney. His most well-known part is perhaps that of the Cardinal in The Duchess of Malfi by John Webster with Janet McTeer at the Royal National Theatre in 2003.

Personal life
In 1997, Stevenson married English actress Ruth Gemmell in London; they had met on the set of Band of Gold (1995), and later played a married couple in Peak Practice (1997). They divorced in 2005 after eight years of marriage. Since 2005, Stevenson has been in a relationship with Elisabetta Caraccia, with whom he has three sons.

Filmography

Film

Television

Stage

References

External links

 
 
 
 

1964 births
Alumni of Bristol Old Vic Theatre School
British people of Irish descent
British male film actors
Living people
People from Cramlington
Actors from Northumberland
People from Lisburn
20th-century British male actors
21st-century British male actors
20th-century male actors from Northern Ireland
21st-century male actors from Northern Ireland
Male actors from Northern Ireland
Male stage actors from Northern Ireland
Male film actors from Northern Ireland
Male television actors from Northern Ireland